Hyperandra excavata is a moth of the family Erebidae first described by William Trowbridge Merrifield Forbes in 1939. It is found in Panama and Nicaragua.

References

Phaegopterina
Moths described in 1939